Washington Sundar (born 5 October 1999) is an Indian international cricketer who plays for the Indian cricket team. He also plays for Sunrisers Hyderabad in the Indian Premier League and Tamil Nadu in domestic cricket. He is a left-handed batsman and right-arm off-spinner. He made his international debut against Sri Lanka on 13 December 2017.

Early life 
Washington Sundar was born in a Tamil Hindu family on 5 October 1999 in Chennai, Tamil Nadu. He was named by his father M. Sundar in honour of a man named P.D. Washington, who had sponsored the elder Sundar's cricket passion. His sister Shailaja Sundar is also a professional cricketer. He started playing cricket from the age of four or five. He received his early education from St. Bede's Anglo Indian Higher Secondary School.

Domestic and IPL career 
He made his first-class debut for Tamil Nadu in the 2016–17 Ranji Trophy on 6 October 2016. Like Ravichandran Ashwin from Tamil Nadu before him, Washington Sundar went from being a batsman as a youngster to making his name as an offspinner. In October 2017, he scored his maiden first-class century, batting for Tamil Nadu against Tripura in the 2017–18 Ranji Trophy. He was also selected for the India U-19 world cup in 2016.

In 2017, he was selected by Rising Pune Supergiant as a replacement for Ravichandran Ashwin. He made his Twenty20 debut for Rising Pune Supergiants in the 2017 Indian Premier League on 22 April 2017. He had received the man of the match award in IPL 2017 Qualifier 1 played between Mumbai Indians and Pune Supergiants, in which he took 3 wickets for 16 runs.

January 2018, he was bought by the Royal Challengers Bangalore in the 2018 IPL auction. In October 2018, he was named in India C's squad for the 2018–19 Deodhar Trophy.

In the 2022 IPL Auction, Sundar was bought by the Sunrisers Hyderabad for ₹8.75 crores.

In August 2022, Sundar played for Lancashire County Cricket Club in the Royal London One-Day Cup and the County Championship. He claimed a five-wicket haul in his debut match against Northamptonshire County Cricket Club.

International career
In November 2017, he was named in India's Twenty20 International (T20I) squad for their series against Sri Lanka. Early the following month, he was also added to India's One Day International (ODI) squad for the same series, after Kedar Jadhav injured his hamstring. He made his ODI debut for India against Sri Lanka on 13 December 2017. Lahiru Thirimanne became his first wicket in international cricket as he clean bowled him out. Sundar then made his T20I debut for India against Sri Lanka on 24 December 2017. At the age of 18 years and 80 days, he became the youngest player to debut for India in T20Is.

In March 2018, he was selected in India's squad for the 2018 Nidahas Trophy against Sri Lanka and Bangladesh. He was praised by many for his economical bowling inside the powerplay at an economy of less than 6 runs an over. During the series, he bagged a maiden 3-wicket haul, making him the youngest ever T20I player to do so. He was named the player of the series for his performance. He then became a regular member of the Indian Twenty20 team.

Sundar was initially only picked for the India's 2020-21 Australia tour as a net bowler; however, numerous injuries to fellow bowlers, and the inability for India to fly in replacements at short notice due to quarantine restrictions in effect during the COVID-19 pandemic, saw him win an unexpected first Test cap on 15 January, in the final Test match of the series at The Gabba. His first Test wicket was Steve Smith, while he scored 62 in his first Test innings in a crucial seventh wicket partnership of 123 with Shardul Thakur which kept India from facing a huge first innings deficit and contributed greatly to India's eventual victory in the test. With his maiden Test fifty, Sundar became only the third Indian to score a half-century on Test debut in Australia.

References

External links
 

1999 births
Living people
Indian cricketers
India Test cricketers
India One Day International cricketers
India Twenty20 International cricketers
Royal Challengers Bangalore cricketers
Rising Pune Supergiant cricketers
Tamil Nadu cricketers
Cricketers from Chennai
Tamil sportspeople
Indian A cricketers
Indian Hindus
Sunrisers Hyderabad cricketers
Lancashire cricketers